Dziedzice may refer to the following places:
 Dziedzice, Greater Poland Voivodeship (west-central Poland)
 Dziedzice, Masovian Voivodeship (east-central Poland)
 Dziedzice, Krapkowice County in Opole Voivodeship (south-west Poland)
 Dziedzice, Namysłów County in Opole Voivodeship (south-west Poland)
 Dziedzice, West Pomeranian Voivodeship (north-west Poland)
 Czechowice-Dziedzice in Silesian Voivodeship
Polish toponymic surnames